Dioundiou is a village and rural commune in the Dioundiou Department of the Dosso Region of Niger.

References

Communes of Niger
Dosso Region